Amphicnaeia flavovittata is a species of beetle in the family Cerambycidae. It was described by Stephan von Breuning in 1940. It was found in southeast Brazil.

References

flavovittata
Beetles described in 1940